Ronnie Alcantara Alonte II (born October 26, 1996, in Biñan, Laguna, Philippines) is a Filipino actor, singer, and dancer. He appeared in the films Seklusyon (2016), Vince and Kath and James (2016), and its sequel James and Pat and Dave (2020).

Alonte is also a member of the dance group Hashtags on the noontime variety show It's Showtime.

Career 
Alonte first appeared as a member of Hashtags in 2015, a dance group in the daytime show It's Showtime. Hashtags released their debut self-titled album on May 21, 2016, with "Roadtrip" released as the album's lead single. Alonte also released a solo single entitled "Love at Website". The single was an entry to the Himig Handog P-Pop Love Songs (2016) which made it to the Top 30 of the competition. Alonte performed the song on Gandang Gabi Vice on August 21, 2016, as well as on It's Showtime.

In 2016, he made several appearances on the drama anthology Maalaala Mo Kaya, including the portrayal of his own story. In the same year, he starred in two films: Vince and Kath and James and Seklusyon directed by Erik Matti, both of which were entered into the 2016 Metro Manila Film Festival.

In 2017, Alonte and Julia Barretto, his co-star in Vince and Kath and James, appeared in the melodrama series A Love to Last, co-starring Bea Alonzo, Ian Veneracion and Iza Calzado. In the same year, he starred in Bloody Crayons as John Jose.

Filmography

Film

Television

Accolades

References

External links
 
 

1996 births
Living people
ABS-CBN personalities
Filipino male film actors
Filipino male television actors
Male actors from Laguna (province)
People from Biñan
Tagalog people
Star Magic personalities
21st-century Filipino male actors